The 2018 American Athletic Conference women's basketball tournament was a postseason tournament that was held March 3–6 in the Mohegan Sun Arena in Uncasville, Connecticut. Connecticut the winner of the American Athletic Tournament earns an automatic bid to the 2018 NCAA Division I women's basketball tournament.

Seeds
All the teams in the American Athletic Conference will qualify for the tournament. Teams are seeded based on conference record, and then a tiebreaker system will be used. Teams seeded 5–12 play in the opening round, and teams seeded 1–4 received a bye to the quarterfinals.

Schedule
All tournament games are nationally televised on an ESPN network:

Bracket

Note: * denotes overtime

See also

 2018 American Athletic Conference men's basketball tournament

References

American Athletic Conference women's basketball tournament
2017–18 American Athletic Conference women's basketball season
2018 in sports in Connecticut
College basketball tournaments in Connecticut
Sports competitions in Uncasville, Connecticut
Women's sports in Connecticut